The O'Connell Sports Center is a multi-purpose arena located in Vancouver, Washington, United States on the campus of Clark College. It is home to the Clark College Penguins and the Vancouver Volcanoes of The Basketball League.

External links
Arena info on Clark College website

Sports venues in Washington (state)
Basketball venues in Washington (state)
Sports in Vancouver, Washington
Buildings and structures in Vancouver, Washington
Tourist attractions in Vancouver, Washington